The DJ 2 In The Mix is the second DJ mix compilation by German producer and remixer ATB, which was released on November 15, 2004. The DJ 2 is a double-CD album, and includes songs by various DJs and producers, all mixed and compiled by ATB.

Track listings

Disc 1 
 ATB - Here With Me (A&T Remix)
 Above & Beyond - No One On Earth (San Francisco Mix)
 Activa - In Essence (Original Mix)
 Mike Shiver & Elevation - Hurricane (Mike Shiver Mix)
 Ridgewalkers Feat. El - Find (Andy Moor Remix)
 Van Eyden Feat. Susanne Webb - The 1 (Original Mix)
 ATB - Recreation (Original Mix)
 DJ Danjo & Rob Styles - Duende (Original Mix)
 Phoenix Star - The Example 60 (Original Mix)
 Aven - All I Wanna Do (Ferry Corsten Remix)
 Corderoy - Deeper (Vocal Mix)
 Blank & Jones - Zero Gravity (Envio Remix)
 Sonar Methods - Echoing Waves (Robert Nickson Remix)
 The Thrillseekers - Synaesthesia (Ferry Corsten Remix)
 Sarah McLachlan - Fallen (Gabriel & Dresden Anti-Gravity Mix)

Disc 2
 ATB - IntenCity (New Clubb Mix)
 Above & Beyond Pres. Tranquility Base - Surrender (Original Mix)
 Ferry Corsten - Sweet Sorrow (The Thrillseekers Remix)
 Alex M.O.R.P.H. - Unification (Original Mix)
 Rank 1 - After Me (Original Mix)
 Tiësto - In My Memory (Gabriel & Dresden Elephant Memory Vocal) (Feat. Nicola Hitchcock Of Mandalay)
 Moonrush - Risky Business (Arc In The Sky Remix)
 Inertia - The Emerald (Original Mix)
 Active Sight - Out Of Our Lives (Original Mix)
 Madison Factor - Lights In Motion (Filo & Peri Bangin Mix)
 Mindcrusher - Vision 05 (Original Funaki Mix)
 Scott Bond & Solar Stone - Red Line Highway (Original Mix)
 Rusch & Murray - The Promise (Ronski Speed Remix)
 Cyclone - Rivierra (Original Mix)
 Exertion - Partizan (Alex M.O.R.P.H. Remix)

ATB albums
DJ mix albums
2004 compilation albums